The Pratt & Whitney R-1690 Hornet was a widely used American aircraft engine. Developed by Pratt & Whitney, 2,944 were produced from 1926 through 1942. It first flew in 1927. It was a single-row, 9-cylinder air-cooled radial design. Displacement was 1,690 cubic inches (27.7 L). It was built under license in Italy as the Fiat A.59. In Germany, the BMW 132 was a developed version of this engine. The R-1860 Hornet B was an enlarged version produced from 1929.

Variants

R-1690-3 
R-1690-5 
R-1690-11 
R-1690-13 
R-1690-S5D1G 
R-1690-52 
R-1690-SDG
R-1690-S1EG 
R-1690-S2EG
R-1690-25 
R-1690-S1C3G 
Fiat A.59 R. License built in Italy with reduction gearing.
Fiat A.59 R.C. License built in Italy with reduction gearing and supercharger.
BMW HornetLicense production of the Hornet in Germany, independently developed as the BMW 132.

Applications
 Bach Air Yacht
 Bellanca 31-40
 Boeing 80
 Boeing Model 95
 Boeing Model 299
 Burnelli UB-14
 Douglas O-38
 Focke-Wulf Fw 200 V1
 Gee Bee Model R-2 (1933)
 Gee Bee R 1/2 Super Sportster
 Granville-Miller-de Lackner R-6H "Q.E.D."
 Junkers Ju 52
 Junkers Ju 86
 Junkers W 34
 Keystone B-3
 Lockheed Model 14 Super Electra (L-14H)
 Lockheed Lodestar (C-56A, C-56B, C-56C, C-56D, C-56E, C-59/Mk 1a)
 Martin BM
 Martin XB-14
 Vought O2U Corsair
 Sikorsky S-40A
 Sikorsky S-42
 Sikorsky S-43
 Wedell-Williams Model 44

Engines on display
 There is a R-1690 on display at the New England Air Museum, Bradley International Airport, Windsor Locks, CT.

Specifications (R-1690 S1E-G)

See also

References

Notes

Bibliography

External links

 Pratt & Whitney R-1690 page

1920s aircraft piston engines
Aircraft air-cooled radial piston engines
R-1690